Amy, la niña de la mochila azul (English: Amy, the Girl with the Blue Backpack) is a Mexican telenovela produced by Televisa in 2004. Starring Danna Paola, Nora Salinas and Eduardo Capetillo, while Pedro Armendáriz Jr. and Tatiana star as co-protagonists with Alejandro Tommasi, Lorena Herrera, Alejandra Meyer, Manuel Landeta and Alejandra Procuna as antagonists.

Cast 
 Eduardo Capetillo as Octavio Betancourt
 Nora Salinas as Emilia Álvarez-Vega
 Lorena Herrera as Leonora Rivas
 Danna Paola as Amy Granados
 Joseph Sasson as Raúl Hinojosa
 Tatiana as Coral / Marina
 Pedro Armendáriz Jr. as Capitán Matías Granados
 Alejandro Tommasi as Claudio Rosales
 Alejandra Meyer as La Prefecta Carlota
 Harry Geithner as César
 Alejandra Procuna as Minerva Camargo
 Carlos Speitzer as Adrian González "El Gato"
 Álex Perea as German Rosales "Chayote"
 Geraldine Galván as Mary Loly Álvarez-Vega
 Nicole Durazo as Mary Pily Álvarez-Vega
 Luciano Corigliano as Paulino Rosales "Pecas"
 Alejandro Speitzer as Tolín
 Christopher Uckermann as Rolando
 Grisel Margarita as Carolina
 Sharis Cid as Angélica Hinojosa #1
 Yolanda Ventura as Angélica Hinojosa #2
 David Ostrosky as Sebastián
 Fabián Robles as Bruno
 Felicidad Aveleyra as Alma
 Manuel Landeta as Tritón
 Raúl Padilla as Gerónimo
 Manuel Valdés as Marcelo
 María Luisa Alcalá as Virginia Castro
 Juan Verduzco as Román
 Lucero Lander as Perla de Granados
 Rosángela Balbó as Perpetua de Beatancourt
 Ricardo de Pascual as Dagoberto
 Isabel Molina as Mercedes
 María Fernanda Sasian as Mini
 Lilibeth Flores as Luly
 Greta Cervantes as Ghost Girl/Minerva (young)
 Génesis Romo as Angel child
 Charly Alberto as Marcial Álvarez-Vega
 Carlos Colin as Marcial
 Pablo Poumian as Fabián
 Rossana San Juan as Soledad
 Alejandro Villeli as Barracuda
 Kathy Castro as Alicia
 Álvaro Carcaño as Jacinto
 Héctor Cruz as Roberto
 Jorge Ortín as Manuel
 Jorge Trejo as Pacoco
 Julio Vega as Melesio
 Levi Nájera as René
 Luis Fernando Madriz as Walter
 Moisés Suárez as Benigno
 Ricky Mergold as Plutarco
 Roberto Munguía as Ramiro
 Roberto Ruy as Juvenal
 Ricardo Kleinbaum as Mauro
 Sandra Destenave as Graciela
 Raúl Sebastián as Chacho
 Karen Sandoval as Valeria
 Miguel Pérez as Uri
 María Prado as La Carcelera

Discography 
 Amy, la niña de la mochila azul vol. 1 (soundtrack)
 Amy, la niña de la mochila azul vol. 2 (soundtrack)
 The Best of Amy, la niña de la mochila azul
 Amy, la niña de la mochila azul: En concierto

Versions 
This telenovela is a remake of the Mexican movie "La niña de la mochila azul" produced in 1979 starring Pedro Fernández and María Rebeca.

See also 
 Danna Paola

References

External links 
 Official Website 
 

Mexican telenovelas
2004 telenovelas
2004 Mexican television series debuts
2004 Mexican television series endings
Spanish-language telenovelas
Televisa telenovelas
Mexican children's television series
Children's telenovelas
Fiction about mermaids
Television series about children